The Mystery of the Aztec Warrior is volume 43 in the original The Hardy Boys Mystery Stories published by Grosset & Dunlap.

This book was written for the Stratemeyer Syndicate by Harriet S. Adams, the daughter of Edward Stratemeyer, in 1964.

Plot summary
The handwritten will of a deceased world-traveller is strange and mysterious. Its instructions are to deliver "the valuable object to the rightful owner, a descendant of an Aztec warrior". What is the valuable object and where is it? What is the name of the owner and where is he? Frank and Joe Hardy have only one clue to work with: the name of a complete stranger who can help find the answers, Roberto Hermosa.

Despite the harassments, the threats, and the attacks made upon them by an unknown, sinister gang, Frank and Joe unravel clue after clue in their adventure-packed search for the living descendant of the mighty Aztec nation which once ruled Mexico. The hunt leads to a marketplace in Mexico City, to the Pyramids at Teotihuacan, to the tombs of Oaxaca-where Chet Morton, the Hardy's buddy, is nearly buried alive by foul play.

It takes as much high courage as clever deduction for the young detectives to defeat their ruthless foes and to decipher the fascinating secrets of the strange and mysterious will.

References

The Hardy Boys books
1964 American novels
1964 children's books
Novels set in Mexico
Grosset & Dunlap books
Aztecs in fiction